Solo: Reflections and Meditations on Monk is a studio album by American jazz trumpeter Wadada Leo Smith. The album was recorded in Finland and released on October 20, 2017 via Finnish TUM Records label. The album contains five tracks written by Thelonious Monk, and three by Smith.

Reception
At Metacritic, that assigns a normalized rating out of 100 to reviews from mainstream critics, the album received an average score of 74, based on four reviews, which indicates "generally favorable reviews".

Derek Taylor of Dusted Magazine wrote "Solo: Reflections and Meditations on Monk finds trumpeter/composer Wadada Leo Smith celebrating the life, music and spirit of the individual he feels the greatest kinship to in the cosmology of creative music." Will Layman of PopMatters stated "This is a piece of serious art, and it is an attempt to very deliberately look at the melodies and moods of a master... Reflection and Meditations on Monk is not an indictment of the brilliant Smith, merely confirmation that even a long and brilliant career has its lows."

A reviewer of Dusty Groove commented "Trumpeter Wadada Leo Smith never fails to blow us away – and even though he's captured our ear with recent higher-concept projects or other group work, he sounds equally mindblowing here in a completely solo setting! As you'd guess from the title, the set's based around the musical vision of Thelonious Monk – territory not often explored on solo trumpet, and handled beautifully here by Smith – both on his long extrapolations based on Monk's compositions, and on his own tunes dedicated to Monk – which are these bold, brilliant paintings in sound that the legendary pianist would have been proud to hear".

Track listing

Personnel
Band
Wadada Leo Smith – composer, liner notes, trumpet

Production
William Gottlieb – photography
Jori Grönroos – photography
Petri Haussila – photography, producer
Miikka Huttunen – mixing
Ole Kandelin – artwork
Juha Lökström – design
Nikopetri Paakkunainen – engineer
Esa Santonen – mastering

References

Wadada Leo Smith albums
2017 albums